William Edward Berry (October 16, 1918 – November 25, 1981) was an American baseball pitcher in the Negro leagues. He played with the Baltimore Elite Giants in 1943.

References

External links
 and Seamheads

Baltimore Elite Giants players
1918 births
1981 deaths
Baseball players from Kentucky
Baseball pitchers
People from Danville, Kentucky
20th-century African-American sportspeople